The Hara Seghira Synagogue is located on Moktar Attia Street, just north of Place L’Independence, in the town of Er Riadh on the island of Djerba, Tunisia.

Er Riadh is the modern name for the ancient Jewish village of Djirt, which became known as “Hara Seghira” or the “Small Ghetto”. As the Jewish community of the village declined the synagogue was abandoned and the building is now in a state of dilapidation. The Jewish community of Er Riadh, numbering around 80, is now centered on the El Ghriba synagogue located on the southern outskirts of the village.

See also
List of synagogues in Tunisia 

Orthodox Judaism in North Africa
Orthodox synagogues in Tunisia
Sephardi synagogues
Former synagogues in Tunisia
Djerba